Mini Clubman may refer to:
BL Mini Clubman, the 1969-1980 British Leyland Mini Clubman 
Morris Mini Clubman, the Australian version of the BL Mini Clubman 
Mini Clubman (2007), the BMW Mini Clubman from 2007